Wapi/Yengis Rural LLG is a local-level government (LLG) of Enga Province, Papua New Guinea.

Wards
01. Yengis
02. Saina
03. Kenailama
04. Mulale
05. Warabul
06. Pulukulama
07. Pumean
08. Kapumanda
09. Mengao
10. Mosop
11. Yambaitok
12. Kopaipalo
13. Olimoli
14. Elem

References

Local-level governments of Enga Province